Lac de Cap-de-Long is a lake in Hautes-Pyrénées, France. At an elevation of 2161 m, its surface area is 1.1 km².

Lakes of Hautes-Pyrénées